Denis Kulyash, the son of Vladislav and Nina, born on May 31, 1983 in Omsk (Russian Federation) is a professional ice hockey defenceman who is currently playing for the HSC Csíkszereda of the Erste Liga. On 6 November 2020 the Romanian Government offered him Romanian citizenship.
Kulyash has been a long-time member of Russia's national ice hockey team known for his extremely hard slap shot, which gained him a nickname "Tsar Cannon". Kulyash currently holds a record of fastest ice hockey shot previously held by Boston Bruins defenceman Zdeno Chara with a speed of 110.3 mph (177.6 km/h).

Playing career
After failing to make it into the senior team of Avangard Omsk, Denis Kulyash made his Russian Super League debut with HC CSKA, enjoying significant success with the club and as a result getting drafted by the Nashville Predators late in the 2004 NHL Entry Draft. The young defenceman then signed with HC Dynamo Moscow in a hotly contested transfer and struggled to play at the same level. His career got back on track when he delivered a productive 2007-08 season after returning to HC CSKA in 2007. In February 2009, Kulyash scored his 50th career goal and thus became a member of the "Fetisov Club".

In January 2010, Kulyash was controversially traded to his home-town club Avangard Omsk in return for two other defencemen, Filipp Metlyuk and Evgeny Kurbatov. He went public with his discontent blaming HC CSKA's General Manager Sergei Nemchinov for the trade. However, Kulyash was quick to retreat expressing his delight at joining his native team. The defenceman managed to score against Metallurg Novokuznetsk, his second game in Avangard's jersey, but was injured in the next game and failed to make an impact throughout the rest of the disappointing season for the club.

In February 2011, Kulyash set the new world record for hardest shot during the KHL All-Star Superskills Competition. His result is 110.3 mph (177.6 km/h).

On May 3, 2011, Kulyash was announced as the new player of the KHL's Ak Bars Kazan. In May 2013 he signed a new two-year contract with Avangard Omsk.

During the 2018-19 season, his 11th in the KHL, Kulyash made 24 appearances with Severstal Cherepovets, before leaving the club and the league to sign for the remainder of the campaign with Korean club, Daemyung Killer Whales, of the AL.

Career statistics

Regular season and playoffs

International

Records
Denis Kulyash set the new world record for shot power, 110.3 mph (177.6 km/h) during the KHL All Star Superskills Competition on 3rd Kontinental Hockey League All-Star Game.

References

External links 
 

 RussianProspects.com Denis Kulyash Profile

1983 births
Living people
Ak Bars Kazan players
Avangard Omsk players
Avtomobilist Yekaterinburg players
HC CSKA Moscow players
Daemyung Killer Whales players
HC Dynamo Moscow players
Nashville Predators draft picks
Russian ice hockey defencemen
Salavat Yulaev Ufa players
Severstal Cherepovets players